Skeletocutis polyporicola is a species of poroid crust fungus in the family Polyporaceae that is found in South America. It was described as a new species in 2011 by mycologists Leif Ryvarden and Teresa Iturriaga. The holotype, collected in Venezuela, was found growing on a dead fruit body of Fomitopsis supina.

References

Fungi described in 2011
Fungi of Venezuela
polyporicola
Taxa named by Leif Ryvarden